Zacharie Noah (2 February 1937 – 8 January 2017) was a Cameroonian professional footballer who won the Coupe de France in 1961 with Sedan-Torcy. Noah, who played as a defender, had previously played for Stade Saint-Germain.

He was the father of French tennis player Yannick Noah and the grandfather of basketball player Joakim Noah.

He died on 8 January 2017, at the age of 79.

References

1937 births
2017 deaths
Cameroonian footballers
Paris Saint-Germain F.C. players
CS Sedan Ardennes players
Ligue 1 players
Association football defenders
Cameroonian expatriate footballers
Cameroonian expatriate sportspeople in France
Expatriate footballers in France